Qatar Museums (formerly the Qatar Museums Authority) is a Qatari government entity that oversees the Museum of Islamic Art (MIA), Mathaf: Arab Museum of Modern Art, MIA Park, QM Gallery at the Katara Cultural Village, ALRIWAQ DOHA Exhibition Space, the Al Zubarah World Heritage Site Visitor Centre, and archaeological projects throughout Qatar, as well as the development of future projects and museums that will highlight its collections across multiple areas of activity including Orientalist art, photography, sports, children's education, and wildlife conservation.

Governance
Qatar Museums is overseen by a board of trustees headed by Sheikha Al-Mayassa bint Hamad bin Khalifa Al-Thani.

Cultural policy

Qatar Museums is a key implementer of Qatari cultural policies, in cooperation with the Ministry of Culture, Arts and Heritage.

Qatar's National Vision 2030 

Qatar Museums is one of the organizations carrying out Qatar's National Vision 2030 program for comprehensive development, progress and prosperity for Qatar. Heritage-led developments play a key role in this program, for among its challenges is the wish to mold modernization around local culture and traditions, maintaining Arab and Islamic identity while showing openness towards other cultures. Sheikha Al Mayassa's mission is for Qatar Museums to turn Qatar into a cultural powerhouse. The Economist reported that a trustee said: “Above all, we want the QMA to be a ‘cultural instigator', a catalyst of arts projects worldwide”. The implementation of cultural policies by the QMA contributed to Doha been named the Arab Capital of Culture in 2010, an initiative taken by the Arab League under the UNESCO.

Membership of the UNESCO World Heritage Committee 

The Qatar Museums Authority was the bid leader for Qatar's successful candidature to join the UNESCO World Heritage Committee in 2011. Qatar also had its first World Heritage site, Al Zubarah Archaeological Site, inscribed during the afternoon session of the UNESCO World Heritage Committee on 22 June 2013 in Phom Penh, Cambodia.

Current and future museums
Qatar Museums' museums have received worldwide attention, particularly the Museum of Islamic art (MIA), putting themselves in line with other museum developments in the area such as Abu Dhabi's (UAE) projected Guggenheim Abu Dhabi and Louvre Abu Dhabi. Critics such as Hans-Ulrich Obrist, director of London's Serpentine Gallery, have argued that Doha takes a different approach to museums from that of Abu Dhabi, aspiring to a new model that does not "copy existing models or replicate western museums, but acknowledges local difference". Martyn Best, director of Cultural Innovations said that "Qatar is the furthest ahead in thinking about how to develop a contemporary Middle Eastern model", searching for a new paradigm for the museums of the 21st century.

All the museums developed by Qatar Museums have included Islamic or Qatari elements either in their architectural design or in their overall concept. In this way its strives in the creation of its own brand trying not to be too commercial. This policy is a reflection of the Qatar Foundation's fourth pillar 'community development' which strives to help foster a progressive society while also enhancing cultural life, protecting Qatar's heritage and addressing immediate social needs in the community. Qatar Museums has repeatedly chosen world-famous foreign architects to design its museums but they insist the architects sought inspiration in Middle Eastern architectural models.

Museum of Islamic Art (MIA)

The museum includes two floors of permanent exhibition galleries, one main temporary gallery, two outdoor courtyards overlooking the city's skyline, an education center, a library, as well as a vast atrium area with a café and a gift shop.

Jodidio, author of the first publication on MIA describes it as the development that will "bridge the gap between tradition and modernity, highlighting the power of culture to transcend differences and cross artificial barriers" inscribing it in the Qatar Foundation's fourth pillar.

MIA Park
Adjacent to the Museum of Islamic Art is the MIA Park, a 280,000 square meter seafront, crescent-shaped park designed by the Pei Partnership Architects of New York City. It includes a sculpture plaza featuring a commissioned work by US Artist Richard Serra titled "7”, the artist's first public work in the Middle East.

MIA Park hosts public activities such as film screenings, sport events, musical events and public programs.

National Museum of Qatar
The new National Museum of Qatar (NMoQ) opened to the public on March 28, 2019. The museum features an innovative design by Pritzker Prize-winning architect Jean Nouvel that is inspired by the desert rose and grows organically around the original 20th century palace of Sheikh Abdullah Bin Jassim Al Thani. This important monument to Qatar's past is now preserved as the heart of the new NMoQ. The relation between the new and old building is part of creating the bridge between the past and the present advocated by Sheikha Al Mayassa for it is the way to "define ourselves instead of forever being defined by others… celebrating our identity."

Located on a 1.5 million-square-foot site at the south end of Doha Corniche, the NMoQ building rises from the sea and is connected to the shore by two pedestrian bridges and a road bridge.

3-2-1 Qatar Olympic and Sports Museum
The 3-2-1 Qatar Olympic & Sports Museum is a national and international center for sports history, heritage, and knowledge to preserve, store, investigate and exhibit sports and sports objects. It opened to the public on 31 March 2022. In September 2022, the museum hosted an exhibition called "World of Football".

Art Mill, Lusail Museum, Qatar Auto Museum 
In 2022, three new facilities were announced.

The first of these facilities is Art Mill: a campus that will include exhibition galleries for modern and contemporary art and space for educational and residential programs. The campus will be built on the site of a historic flour mill and designed by architect Alejandro Aravena (Elemental).

In addition, the Lusail Museum, designed by Jacques Herzog (Herzog & De Meuron), will feature a large collection of Oriental drawings, paintings, photographs, sculptures and applied arts.

Third, the Qatar Auto Museum will feature permanent galleries, all centered around the automobile and its development in Qatar with an added center for the restoration of classic cars. The museum was designed by architect Rem Koolhaas (OMA).

Orientalist collection

The Orientalist collection is one of the most significant collections of Orientalist art ever assembled in the world. It is the only institution in the world dedicated solely to Orientalist art. It comprises paintings, watercolours, sculptures and drawings, which trace Orientalism back to the early 16th century.

The Orientalist collection aims to map an influential period in art history through future programmes and exhibitions and further appreciation and understanding of the relationship between East and West. Significant artworks are loaned to international museums for exhibitions on a regular basis. Work is also displayed in exhibitions organised by the Orientalist collection in Doha and abroad.

There was previously an intention to create an Orientalist Museum, however as of 2019 this proposal is on hold.

Galleries and exhibition spaces

QM Gallery
QM Gallery was founded in 2010 as a space for temporary exhibitions organized by Qatar Museums. Located in the Katara Cultural Village, Building 10, the gallery is a platform for the upcoming museums in Qatar to present their collections, projects, and visions. The gallery also hosts exhibitions of Qatari artists and organizes international exhibitions. The wide range of the exhibitions – such as photography, archaeology, art, sports, architecture and sculpture – makes Qatar Museums Gallery a place of encounter for a broad local and international audience.

ALRIWAQ DOHA Exhibition Space
Located next to the Museum of Islamic Art, ALRIWAQ DOHA is another temporary exhibition space by Qatar Museums covering a total area of 5000 square-meter. Inaugurated in December 2010, ALRIWAQ DOHA provides a venue for local exhibitions by Qatar Museums' museums and departments displaying their historic objects and collections, as well as shows by international artists organized by QM in line with its vision to be a cultural instigator seeking to stimulate debate and discussion.

Fire Station: Artists in Residence
The Fire Station: Artists in Residence program is hosted by Qatar Museums Public Arts Department. This program took the iconic old Civil Defense building in Doha and is transforming it into an open space for creativity. Designed by Qatari architect, Ibrahim Al Jaidah, the Fire Station will have 24 studios and a 700 sq. m gallery, housed in the old garage, to be used by artists participating in the program as well as the local community. It will also host a café, restaurant, bookshop, art supply shop, a cinema, and artist facilities.

This project "will allow for cultural dialogue and exchange between artists living in Qatar and the rest of the world." The rolling nine-month program will be open to Qataris and other artists in the Persian Gulf region, as well as international artists based in Qatar.

Past Exhibitions 

 “American Muscle Cars in Qatar”, National Museum of Qatar, October 2021 to February 2022.
“Jeff Koons: Lost in America”, curated by Massimiliano Gioni, Qatar Museums Gallery-Al Riwaq, November 2021 to March 2022.
“Virgil Abloh: Figures of Speech”, curated by Michael Darling, Fire Station: Artist in Residence, November 2021 to March 2022.
“Kader Attia: On Silence”, Mathaf: Arab Museum of Modern Art, November 2021 to March 2022.
“Christian Dior Designer of Dreams”, M7, November 2021 to March 2022.
"POW! WOW! Festival“, Al Sadd Metro Station, November 2021 to December 2021.
“Beautiful Memories of Palestine“, Museum of Islamic Art (MIA), June 2021 to December 2021.
“Seagrass Tales, Dugong Trails”, National Museum of Qatar, June 2021 to September 2021.
“Mal Lawal 3”, National Museum of Qatar, June 2021 to September 2021.
"Grey Times", Fire Station: Artist in Residence, January 2021 to August 2021.
"Labour of Love: Embroidering Palestinian History", Qatar Museums Gallery – Katara, October to 2022 to January 2023.
"Hana Al-Saadi: Birthday Ceremony", Fire Station, February 2023 to March 2023.

Archaeology, architectural conservation and cultural tourism

Since its establishment, Qatar Museums has managed several archaeological and architectural conservation projects such as surveys, excavations, restoration, rehabilitation projects. These efforts helped uncover, document, protect and promote many archaeological sites, forts, towers, mosques and old buildings across Qatar preserving, therefore, the country's culture and heritage.

Al Zubarah: A UNESCO World Heritage Site

Al Zubarah lies approximately 100 km north-west of Doha. Founded in ca. 1760 by the Banu Utba tribe from Kuwait, Al Zubarah's location in the central Persian Gulf predestined it to become the premier pearling and trading town in this region after the demise of Basra in Iraq.

Covering an area of 60 hectares, Al Zubarah Archaeological Site is the first entry for a Qatari site on the international register and one of 911 natural and cultural properties worldwide.

First excavations in Al Zubarah were undertaken in 1980 by the National Council of Culture, Arts and Heritage and between 2002 and 2005 by Qatar Museums. Since 2009 a joint project between Copenhagen University and QM, the so-called Qatar Islamic Archaeology and Heritage Project, has led to large-scale excavations and restorations, as well as to historical, anthropological and environmental research efforts in Al Zubarah and its hinterland.

Public art in Qatar

Qatar Museums' Public art department is responsible for creating an artist residency program for young local artists to help them develop their skills and horizons, organizing exhibitions featuring international artists and overseeing the installation of artwork by renowned artists in the public realm in Qatar. Sheikha Al Mayassa Bint Hamad Al Thani, QM Chairperson has said: “Through displaying various forms of art in public space, we aim to inspire local talent and establish an organic connection between art and the local community.”

Cultural programmes

The remit of Qatar Museums goes beyond developing museums and art galleries and restoring archaeological sites to other activities, such as organizing and sponsoring various events locally and internationally. Notable examples of these are: the organization of the Doha Tribeca Film Festival in 2009, the installation of a Louise Bourgeois giant sculpture in the Qatar National Convention Center, the sponsoring of the World Cinema Foundation, the sponsoring of exhibitions abroad by international artists including Japanese artist Takashi Murakami's exhibition in Château de Versailles, and English artist and art collector Damien Hirst's exhibition at Tate Modern in 2012.

Cultural Diplomacy Program

Qatar Japan 2012
2012 marked 40 years of positive diplomatic relations between the state of Qatar and Japan. To celebrate this, a year-long series of cultural, sporting and business related activities were held under the banner of Qatar Japan 2012. The program put together for this year included exhibitions, events and activities in both countries such as Takashi Murakami’s exhibition "Ego" at ALRIWAQ DOHA exhibition space and "Pearls: Jewels from the Sea” exhibition in Kobe, Japan. The highlight event of Qatar Japan 2012 was "Qatar Week: Ferjaan in Tokyo" at Roppongi Hills, Tokyo, Japan, which was an occasion to foster understanding of Qatari culture and achievement, and offered opportunities for Japanese public to interact with Qatar through a variety of cultural activities.

Qatar UK 2013, Year of culture
Qatar UK 2013 was a project coordinated by the British Council and Qatar Museums, in association with several partners, including leading arts and education institutions in both countries. As well as building new relationships and supporting existing partnerships in education, sport and science, the year aimed to promote an awareness and appreciation of culture, achievements and heritage, and increased engagement between people and institutions in both countries in the spirit of innovation, openness and learning. The events and activities were taking place in both Qatar and the United Kingdom.

Qatar Brazil 2014
Qatar Brazil 2014 was a year-long cultural exchange programme dedicated to connecting people in the State of Qatar and the Federative Republic of Brazil through culture, community, and sport. Qatar Brazil 2014 was announced in Brasilia on 18 December 2013 during Qatar National Day celebrations at the Qatar embassy in Brasilia, this cultural program aimed to strengthen bilateral relations and create lasting partnerships between Qatar and Brazil by working with partners and sponsors to bring exhibitions, festivals, competitions, and other cultural exchange activities to both countries. 
Qatar Brazil 2014 was held under the patronage of QM Chairperson Sheikha Al Mayassa bint Hamad bin Khalifa Al Thani, in partnership with Qatar's Ministry of Culture, Arts and Heritage. The year officially commenced on 27 January 2014 with a launch reception at the Museum of Islamic Art in Doha.

Qatar Turkey 2015 
The Qatar-Turkey 2015 Year of Cultural Exchange opened with a Turkish gala at the Museum of Islamic Art in Doha. As a symbol of the alliance, a "Qatar” Street was inaugurated in an area on the European side of Istanbul. At the Museum of Islamic Art Park in Doha, a Turkish festival and bazaar featured Turkish music and dance, an open air photo exhibition and cinema and a Turkish teahouse. Several art exhibitions were held, including one in Istanbul about beaded jewelry from Qatar and around the world and the Harem Al Sultan exhibition in Qatar. The joint exhibition "Artistic Journeys: New Angles; New Perspectives" displayed the photographic works of Qatari and Turkish photographers.

Qatar China 2016 
The Qatar-China 2016 Year of Culture opened in Doha with a Jiang’nan style show organized by Qatar Museums, the Ministry of Culture of the People's Republic of China and the Zhejiang Provincial Department of Culture. During China-Qatar 2016 Year of Culture, museums and galleries in Doha presented a series of cultural and artistic exhibitions featuring ancient and modern Chinese art. Additionally, a Chinese festival, which was held at the Islamic Museum of Art Park, provided Chinese markets, food stalls, a Chinese teahouse and various performances. The Islamic Museum of Art hosted the Treasures of China exhibition, which highlighted Chinese history and civilization. The photo exhibition “cultures from different angles”  featured the work of four Chinese and two Qatari photographers, who traveled for two weeks to each other’s home countries to learn about and visually convey a culture other than their own.

Qatar Germany 2017 
The Qatar-Germany 2017 Year of Culture was officially opened at the Katara Opera House with a concert of Qatari and German music. The German Embassy, together with the Goethe Institute and the Doha Film Institute, organized the German Film Week at the Museum of Islamic Art. The Minister of Culture and Sports, Salah bin Ghanim Al Ali, paid a visit to Germany’s stall at the Doha International Book Fair, where Germany was the guest of honor. Siemens Qatar hosted an event for women on the theme of "Culture and Innovation" on International Women's Day. Furthermore, the German Embassy, the Goethe-Institut and the museums of Qatar organized a friendly match between women soccer teams from Germany and Qatar. In addition, Al Riwaq Gallery held the exhibition "Driven by German Design" while the Deutsche Bank Collection exhibited "German Encounters", a collection of German contemporary art.

Qatar Russia 2018 
On the occasion of the Qatar-Russia 2018 Year of Culture, a friendly football match between politicians and artists from Qatar and Russia was held in Moscow's Red Square on the sidelines of the 2018 FIFA World Cup. The two countries exchanged knowledge and ideas as part of the Year of Culture at the 7th International Cultural Forum in Saint Petersburg, with Qatar, a first-time attendee, being the guest of honor. At the "Identify Qatar: (No) Limits of Architecture" conference city planners discussed pioneering architectural projects in Qatar and looked at its most spectacular buildings. Furthermore, numerous art and design exhibitions were held including the publicly celebrated  exhibition "Pearls, Treasures from the Seas and Rivers", which premiered 20 newly added pieces and was held at the State Historical Museum in Moscow. The Embassy of Qatar in Moscow organized a pop-up event of Qatari culture and food during the Russian summer music festival Afisha Picnic.

Qatar India 2019 
Among the artistic highlights of the India-Qatar cultural year 2019 were the exhibitions “Set in Stone: Gems and Jewels from royal Indian Courts” at the Museum of Islamic Art in Doha and “Where Cultures Meet”, an exhibition of photographs from a trip to India as part of the 2019 Year of Culture by two Qatari photographers at the Katara Cultural Village. Two Qatar-based Indian photographers also participated in the exhibition with their works. In addition, a Bollywood-style event was held at the Opera House in Katara, an indoor cricket league was held at the Lusail Sports Arena, and a yoga class was held at the National Museum of Qatar on International Yoga Day.

Qatar France 2020 
As a result of the Covid-19 pandemic, many of the planned events were moved to online platforms. To commemorate the 2020 Qatar-France Year of Culture and its contributions to cultural exchange between the two nations, the Qatar Ambassador to France was given a bronze medal by the Paris Mint. During the height of Covid lockdowns in May 2020, the Cultural Year organized an online Open Call Photo exhibition open to amateurs and professional photographers alike, depicting French and Qatari aspects. Among other events, Qatar Museums and Paris Saint Germain e-Sports organized an e-sports competition between the two countries in the run-up to the 2022 FIFA World Cup in Qatar. Additionally, Michelin-starred French chef Guillaume Sanchez shared homemade traditional Qatari recipes with Qatari and French visitors via video from his restaurant in Paris.

French literature became the focus of attention at the Doha International Book Fair and the best designs by successful Qatari design students from the Qatar Foundation were presented at the Maison et Objets international design fair in Paris. There were also several exhibitions. The Palais de Tokyo Museum in Paris hosted the QM exhibition Our World is Burning and the Musée national Picasso-Paris exhibited outstanding artworks from Picasso's studios at the Fire Station in Doha.

Qatar USA 2021 
The Qatar-USA 2021 Year of Culture program, spanning the whole of the year and encompassing events throughout multiple cultural sections, opened with a joint concert by the U.S. Air Forces Central Band and the Qatar Philharmonic Orchestra at the Katara Cultural Village Opera House.

As part of the Year of Culture, Qatar Museums presented its first exhibition of American artist Jeff Koons in the Gulf region. “Lost in America” shows American culture as experienced by Koons’ throughout his lifetime. The public art initiative JEDARIART of Portland, Oregon, brought Qatar-based artists and their works to the United States giving them a canvas for their murals throughout several cities, including San Francisco, Houston and Miami. The digital Pearls of Wonder exhibition held in New York City in December 2021, allowed visitors to see the Qatari pearl history in the eyes of modern day artists, back to the time when Qatar was one of the world’s main players in the pearl production industry. The Museum of Islamic Art in Doha loaned a collection of seventeenth century textiles and portraits, as well as illustrative manuscripts to the Arthur M. Sackler Gallery of the Smithsonian's National Museum of Asian Art in Washington, D.C. for an exhibition. An exhibition featured the work of an American and a Qatari photographer from a trip through the Pacific Northwest. The Qatar America Institute of Culture saw the Qatar-USA Cultural Year 2021 off with two exhibitions: Cultural Fusion, exhibiting the work of design students and Light & Shadow: A Visual Journey Through Oregon. Both lasting well into 2022 and laying the foundation for the future exchanges in arts and culture. Los Angeles hosted an evening of film screenings by Arab filmmakers. International Women's Day featured a live virtual forum on female empowerment with prominent Qatari and American women.

Furthermore there were various sporting events, culinary experiences, educational programs, and joint business events.

Qatar MENASA 2022 
The 2022 Year of Culture, focusing for the first time on a region rather than an single country, was opened in the courtyard of the Fire Station Gallery with a mix of music, film and cuisine from Qatar and the MENASA region. On the day after the opening ceremony film and musical performances were open to the public at the Doha Film Institute.

Being inaugurated as part of Years of Culture the “Flag Plaza” hosts 119 flags and a installation called “Us, Her, Him” showing the deep and complex interactions between humans. The Yearly held Indian Community Festival was also part of the 2022 Year Of Culture and took place in the Park of the Museum of Islamic Art, focusing on the differences within India trough food, artworks and cultural programs. The 2 day long “Explore Sri Lanka” festival showed a variety of Sri Lankan Arts and handicrafts, as well as the history, religion and parts of Sri Lankan culture within the Education City in Doha. In December 2022 an exhibition dedicated to the Algerian artist Baya Mahieddine featuring 18 of her artworks was opened in the Qatar National Library. The MIA hosted “Baghdad: Eye’s Delight” primarily showcased the history of Baghdad between the 1940’s and 1970’s with 160 items, which in part came from other museums like the Louvre or the Metropolitan Museum of Art. Other exhibitions that were also part of the Qatar MENASA 2022 Year Of Culture included “Sophia Al-Maria: Invisible Labors”, focusing on the Qatari-American artist Sophia Al-Maria, “No Condition is Permanent”, showing Palestine artist Taysir Batniji’s work, and “Majaz: Contemporary Art Qatar”, displaying five years of artworks from the Fire Station Gallery.

International cooperations 
In September 2022 it was announced that Qatar Museums and the New York Metropolitan Museum of Art had agreed on an exchange with regards to exhibitions, activities, and scholarly cooperation. Sheikha Al-Mayassa bint Hamad bin Khalifa Al Thani, Chairperson of Qatar Museums, described the partnership as a welcome opportunity to further the common goal of increasing the appreciation for the art of the Islamic world. To celebrate the completion of the renovation works and reopening of the Doha Museum of Islamic Art as well as the 10th anniversary of the opening of the Metropolitan Museum’s Galleries for the Art of the Arab Lands, Turkey, Iran, Central Asia and Later South Asia, Qatar Museums had made a substantial gift to the Metropolitan Museum, which would benefit its Department of Islamic Art and some of the museum’s other principal projects. To express their appreciation the Metropolitan Museum adopted the name Qatar Gallery for the museum’s Gallery of the Umayyad and Abbasid Periods.

Publications 
Qatar Museums releases regularly publications on arts, archaeology, Islamic history, and oriental studies; both in English and Arabic. Examples of these books are "Qatari-British relations 1914–1949" by Yousif Ibrahim Al Abdullah (1999),"From Cordoba to Samarqand" by Dr. Sabiha Al Khemir (2006), and "Traditional Architecture in Qatar" by Mohammad Jassim Al-Khulaifi (2003).

Education
Qatar Museums entered into a three-way partnership with University College London and Qatar Foundation in 2011. University College London has established UCL Qatar at Education City, a center of excellence for the study of museology, conservation and archaeology. UCL provides master's degrees in these areas, as well as short specialist courses delivered for Qatar Museums staff.

See also
List of museums in Qatar

References

External links
 Qatar Museums homepage (English)
 Qatar Museums Facebook Page Provides up to date information on Qatar Museums projects and activities.

Cultural organisations based in Qatar
Museum associations and consortia
Organizations established in 2005
2005 establishments in Qatar
Arab art scene